BFH may refer to:

 Bacacheri Airport, an airport in Brazil with the International Air Transport Association code BFH 
 Bahrain Financial Harbour, a business complex in Bahrain
 Barchowsky Fluent Handwriting (also known as BFH script), a teaching script for handwriting
 Bern University of Applied Sciences, a vocational university in Switzerland
 Federal Fiscal Court, a German federal court of appeals for cases under fiscal jurisdiction